Juan J. Segura-Egea is a Spanish physician who is Professor of Endodontics in University of Seville. He is best known for developing endodontic medicine, which studies the relationships between systemic pathologies, such as diabetes, cardiovascular disease or smoking., with apical periodontitis and root canal treatment. He is a Certified Member of the European Society of Endodontology (ESE) and vicepresident of the Odontologic Sciences Academy of Spain.

Academics 
He was born in Jaen (Andalucía, Spain) in 1959. He got the degree in Medicine in 1982 from the University of Seville. He received his PhD degree in 1991 from Dpt. of Biochemistry and Molecular Biology, University of Sevilla, Spain. He got the degree in Dentistry at the same University in 1995.

Segura-Egea has authored more than 120 papers in international peer reviewed journals (H index = 33) and more than 200 papers in other scientific journals. He has directed 20 doctoral thesis. He has been editor of Endodoncia (since 2014), the official journal of the Spanish Endodontic Society (AEDE). He is Associated Editor of the Journal of Clinical and Experimental Dentistry, and member of the editorial board of the International Endodontic Journal

In 2022 he appeared in the Ranking of the World Scientists: World´s Top 2% Scientists in Odontology of Stanford University.

Research lines 
He is known for his research in endodontic medicine and antibiotics in the treatment of endodontic infections. He elaborated statement position paper of the ESE (European Society of Endodontology) on antibiotic therapy in infections of endodontic origin

Most cited papers

References 

1959 births
Living people
Spanish biochemists
Spanish medical researchers
Academic staff of the University of Seville